Argus is an unincorporated community in the Searles Valley of the Mojave Desert, in northwestern San Bernardino County, California.

Argus Cogeneration Plant 
Argus was home to the last coal fired circulating fluidized bed (CFB) combustion plant in the state of California, which produced 96 megawatts of power. The plant was shut down due to changing emissions regulations in the state of California.

Searles Valley census-designated place
Argus and the communities of Pioneer Point, Trona, and Searles Valley (community) make up the Searles Valley census-designated place.

See also

References

Unincorporated communities in San Bernardino County, California
Populated places in the Mojave Desert
Searles Valley
Unincorporated communities in California